François Carlo Mey (born 1st July 2003) is an Italian rugby union player, who plays for ASM Clermont Auvergne.

Early life 
François Carlo Mey was born in Italy, from a South African father. He grew up in Parma, where he soon started playing rugby with the city's main club.

Club career 
From Parma, Mey moved to the neighbor Colorno in 2021, to play with the Top10 side Rugby Colorno, where he made his debut aged only 18.

The following summer, he moved to the French Top 14 side ASM Clermont Auvergne.

Mey made his first team sheet appearance for Clermont on the 21 January 2023, for the Champions Cup game against the Stormers.

International career 
François Carlo Mey is a youth international for Italy.
In 2022, Mey was named in Italy U20s squad for annual Six Nations Under 20s Championship.

References

External link
All.rugby profile

2003 births
Sportspeople from Parma
Living people
Italian rugby union players
Rugby union centres
Rugby union fullbacks
Rugby Colorno players
ASM Clermont Auvergne players
Italian people of South African descent